The Priory (C of E Aided) School, Dorking is a voluntary-aided Church of England school for pupils aged 11–16, in Dorking, Surrey. The school opened 1996 on the site of the former Sondes Place School and it takes its name from the land on which it is situated which once belonged to Lewes Priory and was later transferred to Reigate Priory. The school is situated in the parish of St Martin's Church, Dorking and forms part of the Diocese of Guildford. The current Headteacher is Jo Trimnell.

Admissions
The school admits children according to its admissions criteria and they come from both the immediate Dorking area and a wider area which extends east towards Merstham, west to Guildford, north towards Kingston and south into Sussex and beyond Horsham.  The children attending the school are local and nonlocal, Christian and of a wide variety of other beliefs. As a C of E school it is available to local families, C of E families, families from other faiths and families who just like the unique Christian family atmosphere.

References

External links
School website

Dorking
Secondary schools in Surrey
Church of England secondary schools in the Diocese of Guildford
Voluntary aided schools in England